HD 221525 is a single star near the north celestial pole in the constellation Cepheus. At an apparent magnitude of 5.56, it can be seen with the naked eye under dark skies. It is about 30 times fainter than the nearby prominent star Polaris. Based upon parallax measurements, HD 221525 is located at a distance of approximately 317 light years from the Sun, but is drifting closer with a radial velocity of −11 km/s.

This object is an A-type star with a stellar classification of A7IV or A8III, suggesting it is an evolving star on the subgiant or giant branch, respectively. It has a relatively high rate of spin, showing a projected rotational velocity of 110 km/s. The star has four times the radius of the Sun and is radiating 44 times the Sun's luminosity from its photosphere at an effective temperature of 7,466 K.

Progressive house music composer Deadmau5 has named a piece after this star.

References

External links 
 
 

A-type subgiants
A-type giants
Cepheus (constellation)
Durchmusterung objects
221525
8938
115746